Gelacio "Gee" Abanilla is a  Filipino basketball player, coach, and executive who currently serving as the Team Manager for the San Miguel Beermen of the Philippine Basketball Association (PBA).

Playing career
He played for the DLSU Green Archers in the UAAP and with Magnolia Ice Cream in the PBL which were both coached by Derrick Pumaren.  He was 4th round pick of 7-Up Bottlers during the 1993 PBA Draft.

Coaching career

Assistant coach
 
He was once an assistant coach of DLSU Green Archers, Purefoods TJ Hotdogs, FedEx Express, ICTSI-La Salle, and Red Bull Barako respectively from 1998 to present.  He is also served as an assistant coach with the San Miguel Beermen in the PBA.

CSB head coach
He replaced Caloy Garcia and led them to a rollercoaster season, pouched only 4 wins out of 14 outings. But, they slightly improved under him. Due to hectic schedules, he told the CSB management that he would not coach them for a while but he will also return to the bench by July. For the record, assistant coach and PBA commentator Richard del Rosario took over.

Hapee Toothpaste head coach
He replaced Louie Alas in 2008, after Alas resigned after the season before due to back-to-back finals losses to Harbour Centre Batang Pier. Another roller-coaster conference and a semifinals slot are the highlights of Gee's stint with Hapee.

DLSU head coach
On October 25, 2011, De La Salle University announced the formal appointment of Abanilla as the new head coach of the Green Archers during a gathering of team supporters at the Manila Polo Club. He replaces Dindo Pumaren, who resigned after a dismal UAAP Season 74 campaign, with DLSU going out of Final Four contention for the second time since 2009.

On his first season as head coach, Abanilla was able to steer the Green Archers to a Final Four appearance.

On June 8, 2013, it was announced that Abanilla has been replaced by Juno Sauler, one of his assistant coaches, as DLSU head coach. Abanilla is said to be being recalled to the Petron Blaze Boosters.

Petron's head coach
He later head coached the Petron Blaze Boosters, which he led into a Finals stint in his first conference and a semi-finals run in the next conference.

Beermen's team manager 
After that, he was promoted into manager and replaced by assistant Biboy Ravanes.

Coaching record

Collegiate record

PBA

References

External links

Living people
Filipino men's basketball coaches
Filipino men's basketball players
San Miguel Beermen coaches
De La Salle Green Archers basketball players
TNT Tropang Giga draft picks
Year of birth missing (living people)
Benilde Blazers basketball coaches
De La Salle Green Archers basketball coaches